Simon Tortell (8 August 1959 — 15 June 2012) was a Maltese footballer.  He was born in Sliema, Malta.

Club career
Tortell was a striker who played for nine years with Sliema Wanderers, winning a league title and a FA Trophy medal with them. He scored in the 1979 FA Trophy Final against Floriana. He retired at age 24 to graduate from Malta University and become a lawyer.

International career
Tortell made his debut for Malta in an October 1978 European Championship qualification match against Wales. He earned a total of 5 caps, scoring 1 goal.

His final international was the infamous December 1983 European Championship qualification defeat by Spain, which Malta lost 1-12, ensuring that Spain qualified for Euro 1984 ahead of the Netherlands on goal difference.

Personal life
After retirement, Tortell became a successful lawyer and was partner at his own firm Simon Tortell & Associates. His father, Peter Tortell, also played for Sliema Wanderers in the 1950s. Simon Tortell died after a long illness on June 14, 2012, at age 52. He was married to Silvana Tortell and was father of three daughters.

Honours

Floriana
Maltese Premier League: 1
 1976

Maltese FA Trophy: 1
 1979

References

External links
 Obituary - Times of Malta

1959 births
2012 deaths
People from Sliema
Association football forwards
Maltese footballers
Malta international footballers
Sliema Wanderers F.C. players
20th-century Maltese lawyers
21st-century Maltese lawyers